Guapiara is a municipality in the state of São Paulo in Brazil. The population is 17,025 (2020 est.) in an area of 408 km². Its elevation is 750 m.

The municipality contains part of the  Serra do Mar Environmental Protection Area, created in 1984.
It contains part of the  Intervales State Park, created in 1995.

References

Municipalities in São Paulo (state)